2015 Baghdad bombings may mean

 February 2015 Baghdad bombings
 2015 Baghdad market truck bombing
 October 2015 or November 2015 events listed at Terrorist incidents in Iraq in 2015